A papilloma (plural papillomas or papillomata) (papillo- + -oma) is a benign epithelial tumor growing exophytically (outwardly projecting) in nipple-like and often finger-like fronds. In this context, papilla refers to the projection created by the tumor, not a tumor on an already existing papilla (such as the nipple).

When used without context, it frequently refers to infections (squamous cell papilloma) caused by human papillomavirus (HPV), such as warts. Human papillomavirus infection is a major cause of cervical cancer, vulvar cancer, vaginal cancer, penis cancer, anal cancer, and HPV-positive oropharyngeal cancers. Most viral warts are caused by human papillomavirus infection (HPV), of which there are nearly 200 distinct human papillomaviruses (HPVs), and many HPV types are carcinogenic. There are, however, a number of other conditions that cause papilloma, as well as many cases in which there is no known cause.

Signs and symptoms

A benign papillomatous tumor is derived from epithelium, with cauliflower-like projections that arise from the mucosal surface.
It may appear white or normal colored. It may be pedunculated or sessile. The average size is between 1–5 cm. Neither sex is significantly more likely to develop them. The most common site is the palate-uvula area followed by tongue and lips. Durations range from weeks to 10 years.

Presence of HPV
Immunoperoxidase stains have identified antigens of the human papillomavirus (HPV) types 6 and 11 in approximately 50% of cases of squamous cell papilloma.

Prognosis
There is no evidence that papillomas are premalignant.

Differential diagnosis
 Intraoral verruca vulgaris, 
 Condyloma acuminatum, and 
 Focal epithelial hyperplasia.

Note: differentiation is done accurately by microscopic examination only.

Treatment
With conservative surgical excision, recurrence is rare.

See also 
Skin tag
Inverted papilloma
 Squamous cell papilloma
 Urothelial papilloma
 Intraductal papilloma of breast
 Wart
Genital wart
Plantar wart
 Papillomavirus
 Human papillomavirus

References

External links 

 Choroid Plexus Papilloma - Palmer, Cheryl Ann and Daniel Keith Harrison; EMedicine; Jun 5, 2008

Benign neoplasms
Glandular and epithelial neoplasia
Histopathology